Plasmodium ovale curtisi is a subspecies of parasitic protozoa that causes tertian malaria in humans. The subspecies was described in 2010 when it was established that the two subspecies of Plasmodium ovale, while morphologically identical are genetically distinct.

Epidemiology
P. ovale curtisi has been identified in Ghana, Myanmar, Nigeria, São Tomé, Sierra Leone and Uganda.

Clinical features

Clinical features for P. ovale curtisi are described in the article on Plasmodium ovale.

Phylogenetics

This species separated from its closest known relative, Plasmodium ovale wallikeri, between 1.0 and 3.5 million years ago.

References

ovale curtisi
Subspecies